Jach'a Qiñwa Qullu (Aymara jach'a big, qiñwa a kind of tree, qullu mountain, "big qiñwa mountain", also spelled Jacha Khenwakkollu) is a mountain in the Andes of Bolivia which reaches a height of approximately . It is located in the La Paz Department, José Manuel Pando Province, Catacora Municipality. Jach'a Qiñwa Qullu lies north of the Jaruma River, east of Ch'alla Willk'i.

References 

Mountains of La Paz Department (Bolivia)